Vickery, Atkins & Torrey was an interior design firm and art gallery in San Francisco, California, that helped introduce California to Impressionism. It opened in 1888 on Grant Avenue at Morton Street (now called Maiden Lane), where it was destroyed in the 1906 fire, and after a few years reopened at 550 Sutter Street, where it stayed in business until 1933.

History

William Kingston Vickery founded an interior design firm and art gallery in San Francisco in 1888 with his nephew Henry Atkins. In about 1891 they were joined by Frederick C. Torrey (1864–1935), a specialist in prints and Chinese porcelains.  In 1900 the company became Vickery, Atkins & Torrey. During the 1890s William Vickery supervised a series of loan exhibitions that helped introduce Impressionism to California in the form of paintings by Monet, Eugène Boudin, Paul Cézanne, Camille Pissarro, Pierre-Auguste Renoir, and Edgar Degas. These pictures were lent by Californian impressionist Lucy Bacon, who studied in France under Camille Pissarro and met Paul Cézanne, and Mrs. William H. Crocker, the leading California patron of French Impressionist art at the time.

In its gallery, the company exhibited European, American and Japanese prints, Pictorialist photography, paintings and sculpture. Some of the prominent California artists who had one-person exhibitions there were Anne Bremer, Maynard Dixon, William Keith, Xavier Martinez, Francis McComas, Arthur Putnam, and Mary Curtis Richardson.

Vickery, Atkins & Torrey designed interiors for mansions, clubs and universities.  The firm sold furniture, decorative objects and jewelry, including many works designed by Henry Atkins.  The firm also published art books.

Locations
Vickery, Atkins & Torrey moved to several locations within San Francisco during its existence:
  22 Montgomery Street
  126 Kearny Street
  631 Market Street
  108 Grant Street
  236 Post Street (where it was located at the time of the 1906 earthquake)
  1774 California Street (temporary location after the 1906 earthquake)
  550 Sutter Street, San Francisco

References

Art museums and galleries in California
Art galleries established in 1888
Art galleries disestablished in 1933
1888 establishments in California
1933 disestablishments in California